The 1978 National Camogie League is a competition in the women's team field sport of camogie was won by Kilkenny, who defeated Limerick in the final, played at Adare.

Arrangements
Kilkenny, the 1977 senior champions, defeated Antrim, Down, Dublin and Wexford en route to the final while Limerick the 1977 All-Ireland junior champions, defeated Clare, Cork, Galway and Tipperary.

Final
Kilkenny led 1–2 to 0–3 at half–time and responded to an equalising goal by Pauline McCarthy to eventually win a keenly contested final between two well matched sides. Marion Doyle’s point at the very end reduced the margin to two points. Agnes Hourigan wrote in the Irish Press: This was a game that Limerick could have won had they taken their chances. They had three good scoring opportunities in the first half and muffed a 15-yards free in the closing stages. The winner’s experience was the vital difference between the two sides. Helena O'Neill, now Mrs McCormack, interrupted her honeymoon to take part in the final and played a vital role in her side’s victory, scoring all four point. The winners’ success was all the more meritorious as they had to field without two of their star players Liz Neary and Angela Downey. 
The O'Brien sisters’ brother Jim was an All-Ireland hurler while Vera Mackey also came from a hurling family.

Final stages

References

External links
 Camogie Association

National Camogie League
1978